A fried egg is a cooked dish made from one or more eggs which are removed from their shells and placed into a frying pan and fried. They are traditionally eaten for breakfast in many countries but may also be served at other times of the day.

Regional adaptations and specialities

Austria, Germany, and Switzerland 

Fried eggs over (or side-by-side with) pan-fried potatoes is another common dish, sometimes served with spinach as a third component of the meal. Some German cooks break the yolk and distribute it across the surface of the white during the frying.

All of the above are typically lunch, rather than breakfast, dishes, although eggs themselves (like boiled or scrambled eggs) are a common part of a German breakfast.

Bangladesh and India 
In Bangladesh and India, fried eggs are commonly served alone or as an accompaniment to bread. It may also occasionally be served with dosa, paratha, or roti. During or after the frying stage, they are sometimes sprinkled lightly with condiments such as black pepper, chili powder, green chili, and salt.

In central and northern India's English-speaking middle classes and mid-level restaurants, "single-fried" refers to sunny side up (also known as a "bullseye") and "double-fried" to over hard. Street food parlance uses "half-fry" or "half boil" as a base term with "half fry bina palti" (un-flipped) meaning sunny side up and "half fry palti maarke" or "alti palti" (flipped) meaning over easy/medium/hard where the customer oversees the flip and says when.

Cambodia and Vietnam 
In Cambodia, a fried egg is often served on top of a common dish called beef lok lak. It is made of a ring of spinach, onion finely shaven, and tomato with either a portion of venison or beef with gravy, topped with a fried egg, either duck or chicken egg.

In Vietnam, a fried egg (Trứng ốp la) served over white rice, topped with a dab of oyster or hoisin sauce, is also popular in east Asia. Fried eggs are also sometimes used in a bánh mì.

Czech Republic 
Fried egg prepared sunny side up is known as "volské oko" or "sázené vejce" in Czech cuisine and they are served either alone as part of breakfast, or for lunch with a side of spinach and boiled potatoes.

Egypt 
In Egypt, fried eggs are a common breakfast food. They are fried in fat such as vegetable oil, butter, or ghee and served either plain or with other foodstuffs such as tomatoes, cheese, sausage, or minced meat with onions and spices; they may also be served with ful medames (slow-cooked fava beans).

Indonesia 

In Indonesia, fried eggs are served either as telur ceplok or telur mata sapi (Indonesian for "bull's eye egg") which refer to sunny side up eggs, as telur dadar (omelette) or as telur orak-arik (scrambled eggs). The fried eggs are either setengah matang which is half cooked with still runny yolk or matang which is well done. When speaking English, an Indonesian waiter may ask if you want the egg fried "one side" or "two sides". Fried eggs, especially bull's eye egg, are a popular topping for Indonesian fried rice (nasi goreng) and fried noodle (mie goreng), either freshly prepared noodle or cooked from instant noodle Indomie Mi goreng. 

A simple dish of fried sunny side up egg served on top of steamed rice drizzled with kecap manis sweet soy sauce, is a favourite dish among Indonesian children. Other than served with rice, fried eggs might be served with bread as a sandwich for breakfast. Seasoning includes salt and pepper, sweet soy sauce, and sometimes hot and spicy sambal chili paste.

Ireland and the United Kingdom 

Fried eggs can be served on toast, or in a sandwich, with bacon, sausages, and a variety of condiments. Eggs are often part of the full breakfast commonly eaten in Britain and Ireland. Fried eggs are often served with ham or gammon steak as a popular pub meal. The egg is cooked on high heat and hot fat, oil, or water may be splashed onto the top of the egg to baste it and cook the white. They are usually cooked without turning over.

Hispanic and Lusitanic world 

A similar dish, with the name  in Spanish, is also common in Argentina, Ecuador, and Uruguay (called churrasco); fried potatoes and salad replace the beans and rice.

In Ecuador, llapingachos include a sunny side-up egg served over pan-seared cheesy mashed potatoes and fried sausage.

In northern Mexico,  (riding eggs) are served with refried beans and fried potatoes (or french fries).

Also, in some parts of Mexico, fried eggs are served with fresh tomato, onions, and cilantro salsa. Red chili is optional, as is a blended sauce.

In Spain fried eggs (huevos fritos) are a common dish. They are eaten alone, with meat, or with sausages. In this country, a fried egg served with boiled rice covered in tomato sauce is called arroz a la cubana in Spanish and the same dish is served in parts of Latin America, Italy (so-called occhio di bue, transl: ox's eye), the Philippines, and Portugal as well.

Poet Nazım Hikmet says, in an interview, that he stayed with a Spanish friend for a month and ate fried eggs almost every day.

Japan 
Called "medama yaki" (目玉焼き, lit.: cooked eyeball), fried eggs are usually made sunny side up. They may be served with salt and pepper, soy sauce, or Japanese-style Worcestershire sauce. Fried eggs are a popular breakfast dish, with toasted sliced bread or rice.

Korea 
Called 계란부침 (gyeranbuchim, 'egg pancake') or more commonly 계란후라이 (gyeran hurai, 'egg fry'). Eggs are fried in cooking oil, sometimes with a sprinkle of salt. In Busan area, fried eggs are often served with Jjajangmyeon.

Malaysia and Singapore 
Just as in Indonesia, nasi goreng, one of the popular fried rice dish in Malaysia and Singapore is often served with a fried egg.

Netherlands 

In the Netherlands, a fried egg is normally served on top of a slice of bread (white or whole wheat), often with fried bacon, for breakfast or lunch.

An  is a dish consisting of two or three fried eggs, sunny side up. One version is fried together with ham and cheese, or bacon and cheese. Another version is placed on buttered bread over a generous slice of cold meat, e.g., cooked beef or ham, and usually garnished with a dill pickle. It is a common lunch dish served in many cafes, canteens, and lunch rooms in the Netherlands.  literally means "out-thrower", and it is also a Dutch word for a "bouncer".

Nigeria 
What is known as "scrambled eggs" in the US and UK is called "fried eggs" in Nigeria, while what is known as "fried eggs" in the US and UK would be known as "half-fried eggs" in Nigeria. The mai shai stalls cook scrambled eggs to the point of being heavily crisp.

Philippines 

In the Philippines, fried eggs are often cooked like a sunny-side egg but the yolk is half cooked - referred to as malasado (from the Spanish, meaning undercooked) - by sprinkling it with salt and oil while being fried, giving it a distinctive pink-colored membrane. It is served in the morning with garlic rice and a choice of breakfast meat such as beef tapa, longaniza, fried milkfish, dried fish, tocino (caramelised pork), Spam, or corned beef, such as in tapsilog and its variants. In addition, fried eggs are eaten in a dish called Arroz a la cubana, which is seasoned ground beef with raisins, cubed potatoes, tomato sauce, and olives, along with white rice and fried ripe plantains. Fried eggs are also a main ingredient in the noodle dish Pancit Batil Patong, where a fried egg is topped over stir-fried noodles.

Russia 

A common way of preparing both types is to have multiple eggs cracked into a saucepan or frying pan and cooked without flipping. The whites flow together and individual portions are divided up after the whole pan-full has cooked.

Thailand 

In Thai cuisine, when the words  (lit. "star egg") are placed after the name of a dish, it means that one wants that dish accompanied by a fried egg. The very popular  for instance, translates to "basil fried pork on top of rice with a fried egg". Sometimes this is referred to as a "top egg". Fried rice is also popularly accompanied with a fried egg, such as with khao phat Amerikan and khao phat (standard Thai-style fried rice). Another popular way of eating fried eggs in Thailand is to use it as the main ingredient of the Thai salad called yam khai dao.

United States and Canada

North Americans use different terms to describe the degree and method to which fried eggs are cooked, including:

 Over easy or over light
 Cooked on both sides; the yolk is runny and the egg white is fully cooked.
 Over medium
 Cooked on both sides; the yolk is cooked through but soft and near liquid at the center. The egg white is thoroughly cooked.
 Over hard or over well
 Cooked on both sides all the way through, with the yolk broken (immediately after the egg is cracked).
 Sunny-side up
 Cooked on one side only, until the egg white is set, but the yolk remains liquid. Gently splashing the hot cooking oil or fat over the sunny side uncooked white (i.e., basting) may be done to thoroughly cook the white. Covering the frying pan with a lid during cooking (optionally adding a cover and half-teaspoon of water just before finishing) allows for a less "runny" egg, and is an alternative method to flipping for cooking an egg over easy (this is occasionally called sunny side down or basted). Sunny side-up eggs are also commonly referred to as dippy eggs or dip eggs by Pennsylvania Dutch people living in central Pennsylvania, in parts of Ohio, and in Pittsburgh mainly due to the practice of dipping toast into the yolk while eating. This term is also occasionally used in Canada. They are also sometimes called moon eggs by those residing in eastern Maryland.
Scrambled
While raw, the egg is whipped using a fork or whisk until the white and yolk are homogenously mixed, then the egg is occasionally stirred while it is frying to ensure even cooking.  Optionally, other ingredients like bell pepper and onion can be added as the egg is nearing completion, although they are usually served plain.  This blending of yolk and white is the same way raw eggs are prepared when making an omelet.

Egg in the basket 

The name "toad in the hole" is sometimes used for this dish, particularly in the U.S., though that name more commonly refers to sausages cooked in Yorkshire pudding batter. This dish is usually made by cutting a circle or other shape out of a slice of bread, often using a drinking glass or biscuit cutter.  The bread is fried until brown on one side and then flipped, and an egg is broken into the center and seasoned, usually with salt and pepper, and sometimes herbs. The pan is then covered, and the egg is cooked until the white is just set.  The cutout center of the bread is often fried as well and served alongside or on top of the finished egg.

See also 

 Deep fried egg
 Egg sandwich
 Green Eggs and Ham
 List of egg dishes

References 

Egg dishes
Fried foods